Cilliba is a genus of tortoise mites in the family Uropodidae. There are more than 20 described species in Cilliba.

Species
These 21 species belong to the genus Cilliba:

 Cilliba antennurelloides Lombardini, 1943
 Cilliba aplicata Vitzthum
 Cilliba athiasae (Hirschmann & Zirngiebl-Nicol, 1969)
 Cilliba cassidea (Hermann, 1804)
 Cilliba cassideasimilis
 Cilliba cassidoidea (Hirschmann & Zirngiebl-Nicol, 1969)
 Cilliba erlangensis Hirschmann & Zirngiebl-Nicol, 1969
 Cilliba eulaelaptis Vitzthum, 1930
 Cilliba foroliviensis Lombardini, 1961
 Cilliba franzi (Hirschmann & Zirngiebl-Nicol, 1969)
 Cilliba insularis
 Cilliba kleinei Vitzthum, 1921
 Cilliba malayica Vitzthum, 1921
 Cilliba permagna Vitzthum
 Cilliba rafalskii
 Cilliba regia Vitzthum, 1921
 Cilliba sellnicki (Hirschmann & Zirngiebl-Nicol, 1969)
 Cilliba stammeri (Hirschmann & Zirngiebl-Nicol, 1969)
 Cilliba translucida Vitzthum, 1921
 Cilliba tripliciterscutata Lombardini, 1943
 Cilliba woelkei (Hirschmann & Zirngiebl-Nicol, 1969)

References

Uropodidae
Articles created by Qbugbot